A capitol, named after the Capitoline Hill in Rome, is usually a legislative building where a legislature meets and makes laws for its respective political entity.

Specific capitols include:
 United States Capitol in Washington, D.C.
 Numerous U.S. state and territorial capitols
 Capitolio Nacional in Bogotá, Colombia
 Capitolio Federal in Caracas, Venezuela
 El Capitolio in Havana, Cuba
 Capitol of Palau in Ngerulmud, Palau

Capitol, capitols, or The Capitol may also refer to:

Entertainment and Media
 Capitol (board game), a Roman-themed board game
 Capitol (The Hunger Games trilogy), a fictional city in The Hunger Games novels
 Capitol (TV series), a U.S. soap opera
 Capitol (collection), a book by Orson Scott Card
 The Capitols, a Detroit, Michigan-based soul trio

Business
 Capitol Wrestling Corporation, a predecessor organization to World Wrestling Entertainment
 Capitol Records, a U.S. record label
 Capitol Air, originally known as Capitol International Airways, an American charter airline operating from 1946 to the mid 1980s

 Other locations
 Capitoline Hill in Rome (from which the word capitol derives)
 Capitols, former name of the Capitol Corridor passenger train route in California, United States
 Capitole de Toulouse, an historic building in Toulouse, France, now used as a municipal and public-arts center
 The capitouls of Toulouse, the city's former chief magistrates
 Capitol College, a private, non-profit, and non-sectarian college located just south of Laurel, Maryland
 Capitol Reef National Park, a U.S. National Park in south-central Utah
 Capitolium, the temple for the Capitoline Triad in many cities of the Roman Empire
 The Capitol (Hong Kong), a large private housing estate in Hong Kong
 The Capitol (Fayetteville, North Carolina), department store
 Capitol (Williamsburg, Virginia), a historic building that housed the House of Burgesses of the Colony of Virginia 1705–1779

See also
 
 Capital (disambiguation)
 Capitol Center (disambiguation)
 Capitol Hill (disambiguation), a number of districts in the United States and Canada
 Capitol station (disambiguation)
 Capitol Theater (disambiguation), a number of former and current cinemas or theatres located throughout the world
 Le Capitole (train), a former express train between Paris and Toulouse